Ernst Fiala (23 February 1940 – 11 November 2006) was an Austrian football defender who played for Austria. He played for FK Austria Wien.

External links
 
 

1940 births
Austrian footballers
Austria international footballers
Association football forwards
FK Austria Wien players
2006 deaths